Hountondji is a surname. Notable people with the surname include:

Andréas Hountondji (born 2002), French footballer 
Cédric Hountondji (born 1994), French footballer
Gisèle Hountondji (born 1954), Beninese writer, interpreter, and translator
Paulin J. Hountondji (born 1942), Beninese philosopher and politician